The International Socialist Circle was an anarchist political organisation in Argentina, founded 1879 in Buenos Aires. After several permutations, the movement emerged into the Argentine Regional Workers' Federation in 1901.

References

Defunct anarchist organizations in South America
Anarchist organisations in Argentina
Socialism in Argentina